Yūsuke, Yusuke, or Yuusuke is a masculine Japanese given name.

Possible writings
Yūsuke can be written using different combinations of kanji characters. Some examples: 

勇介, "courage, mediate"
勇助, "courage, to help"
勇輔, "courage, to help"
勇祐, "courage, to help"
勇佑, "courage, to help"
勇丞, "courage, to help"
雄介, "masculinity, mediate"
雄助, "masculinity, to help"
雄輔, "masculinity, to help"
雄祐, "masculinity, to help"
雄佑, "masculinity, to help"
雄丞, "masculinity, to help"
友介, "friend, mediate"
友助, "friend, to help"
友輔, "friend, to help"
有介, "possessing/having, mediate"
由介, "reason, mediate"
裕祐, "abundant, to help"
柚介, "citron, mediate"
愉祐, "pleasure, to help"

The name can also be written in hiragana ゆうすけ or katakana ユウスケ.

Notable people with the name
Yusuke Aihara (相原 裕介, born 1994), a Japanese professional vert skater
Yusuke Chiba (born 1968), Japanese singer who formerly sang for Thee Michelle Gun Elephant and is the founder of the garage rock band The Birthday
Yusuke Fujimoto (born 1975), Japanese former heavyweight kickboxer
Yusuke Hagihara (1897–1979), Japanese astronomer known for his contributions to celestial mechanics
Yusuke Hashiba (1851-1921), Japanese archaeologist
Yusuke Hatanaka (born 1985), Japanese cyclist
Yusuke Hatano (born 1986), Japanese composer and arranger
Yusuke Hayashi (born 1990), Japanese footballer
Yusuke Higa (born 1989), Japanese footballer who plays for the Yokohama F. Marinos
Yusuke Hino (born 1985), Japanese professional wrestler
, Japanese shogi player
, Japanese footballer
Yusuke Iseya (born 1976), Japanese actor
Yusuke Kamiji (born 1979), Japanese actor, singer, and tarento
Yusuke Kaneko (born 1976), Japanese ski jumper
Yusuke Kato (加藤 友介, born 1986), Japanese footballer, who plays for Nakhon Ratchasima F.C. in the Thai Premier League
Yusuke Kawazu (born 1935), Japanese actor
Yusuke Kobori (born 1981), retired Japanese professional boxer and former WBA lightweight champion
Yuusuke (musician) (full name Yusuke Kuniyoshi , born 1985), musician and one of the two vocalists of the hard rock band High and Mighty Color
Yusuke Matsui (born 1987), Japanese baseball player
Yusuke Maruyama (born 1995), Japanese actor, singer
Yusuke Mine (峰 祐介, born 1934), Japanese actor best known for his role on the 26-lesson TV program Let's Learn Japanese
Yusuke Mori (born 1980), Japanese footballer who plays for Tokyo Verdy
, Japanese curler
Yusuke Murata (born 1978), Japanese manga artist
Yusuke Naora (born 1971), Japanese video game art director and character designer at Square Enix
, Japanese footballer
, Japanese long-distance runner
, Japanese rugby union player
Yusuke Numata (born 1968), Japanese voice actor
Yusuke Oeda (born 1935), Japanese professional Go player
Yusuke Okada (basketball) (born 1984), Japanese basketball player
Yusuke Omi (近江 友介, born 1946), Japanese footballer
Yusuke Saikawa (斉川 雄介, born 1985), Japanese former soccer player
Yusuke Sato (born 1977), Japanese footballer
Yusuke Shimada (born 1982), Japanese footballer
, Japanese water polo player
, Japanese voice actor
Yusuke Suzuki (racewalker) (born 1988), Japanese racewalker
Yusuke Suzuki (footballer) (born 1982), Japanese footballer
Yusuke Santamaria (real name Yusuke Nakayama , born 1971), Japanese singer and actor
Yusuke Takahashi (born 1997), Japanese tennis player
, Japanese long-distance runner
Yusuke Tanaka (football forward) (born 1986), a Japanese footballer who plays for the J. League team JEF United Ichihara Chiba
Yusuke Tanaka (football defender) (born 1986), Japanese footballer  who plays for the J. League team Kawasaki Frontale
Yusuke Tanaka (gymnast), Japanese gymnast who competed for Japan in the 2012 Summer Olympics
Yusuke Tomoi (born 1980), Japanese actor from Hokkaidō Japan
, Japanese baseball player
, Japanese shogi player
Yusuke Yachi (born 1980), Japanese race walker
Yusuke Yada (born 1983), Japanese footballer currently playing for Kataller Toyama
Yusuke Yamagata (born 1986), Japanese footballer
Yusuke Yamamoto (born 1988), Japanese actor from Aichi Japan
Yusuke Yoshizaki (吉崎 雄亮, born 1981), Japanese former football player

Fictional characters
Yusuke Amamiya, a character in the Super Sentai television series Choujuu Sentai Liveman
Yusuke Fujisaki, the main character of Sket Dance anime and manga
Yusuke Fujiwara, a character in the anime spin-off series Yu-Gi-Oh! Duel Monsters GX
Yusuke Godai, the main character in the tokusatsu television series Kamen Rider Kuuga
Yusuke Kitagawa, a playable character from Persona 5
Yusuke Makishima, a character of Yowamushi Pedal
Yusuke Oda (小田 裕介), a character of Hajime no Ippo
Yusuke Sakamoto, the main character in the 2000 film Juvenile
Yusuke Yoshino, a character from the visual novel, manga, and anime Clannad
Yusuke Urameshi, the main character in the YuYu Hakusho anime and manga series 

Japanese masculine given names